John William Williams (15 February 1885 – 5 June 1916), also known as James Williams and referred to as "Ginger" Williams, was a Welsh professional footballer who won two caps for the Wales national football team and played in the Football League for Birmingham. He died on active service during the First World War.

Playing career

Club career
Williams was born in Buckley, Flintshire, to coal miner William Williams and his wife, Elizabeth Williams. A prolific scorer in junior football, he played for Bury, though not in the Football League, and for Accrington Stanley before impressing on trial with Second Division club Birmingham. Williams signed for them in August 1908, and made his debut on 7 September 1908, playing at inside left in a 3–1 win at home to Bradford. He was given a decent run of games in the starting eleven, but failed to impress, and returned to Accrington Stanley in February 1909.

In the 1909 close season, he moved to Crystal Palace of the Southern League. With Palace his best position was centre forward or inside right, though he was capable of playing in any forward role. Described as "an eager, neat and busy little footballer who possessed a snappy tackle and plenty of enthusiasm and determination", he scored 58 goals from 149 appearances in all competitions, including scoring five in one match against Southend United in September 1909. Williams remained with the club for nearly five seasons, during which time he won two caps for Wales. In February 1914 he joined Millwall, also playing in the Southern League, and remained with the club for about a year.

International career
Williams made his international debut for Wales in the 1912 British Home Championship against Scotland national football team at Tynecastle on 2 March 1912. Wales lost 1–0. His second cap came in a 3–2 defeat at Ninian Park against Ireland in the same competition.

Personal life
Williams was born in Buckley, Flintshire, and was married to Sarah. He had a son, Kenneth, born in August 1913. He enlisted in the 17th Battalion, Middlesex Regiment – the Footballers' Battalion – and served in northern France during the First World War. He transferred to the Royal Engineers and was killed in a mine explosion in June 1916. He is commemorated on the Arras Memorial and at Millwall F.C.'s ground. His death was widely reported, including in The New York Times.

Notes

References

External links
 Williams' details at the Commonwealth War Graves Commission
 Clipping regarding the player's death in action from the New York Times archive

1885 births
1916 deaths
People from Buckley, Flintshire
Sportspeople from Flintshire
Welsh footballers
Wales international footballers
Association football forwards
Bury F.C. players
Accrington Stanley F.C. (1891) players
Birmingham City F.C. players
Crystal Palace F.C. players
Millwall F.C. players
English Football League players
Southern Football League players
British military personnel killed in World War I
Middlesex Regiment soldiers
British Army personnel of World War I
Royal Engineers soldiers
Military personnel from Flintshire